When We Were Lost  is the debut album of The Lofty Pillars, released on July 18, 2000, through Atavistic Records.

Track listing

Personnel 
The Lofty Pillars
Gerald Dowd – drums, vocals
Joe Ferguson – vocals, engineering, mixing
Ryan Hembrey – bass guitar
Wil Hendricks – accordion, piano, vocals
Charles Kim – electric guitar
Glenn Kotche – drums
Michael Krassner – singing, guitar, production, mixing
Nate Lepine – reeds
Fred Lonberg-Holm – cello, nyckelharpa, arrangement
Julie Pomerleau – violin
Production and additional personnel
Pierre Hambur – painting
David Pavkovic – mastering

References 

2000 debut albums
The Lofty Pillars albums
Atavistic Records albums